The 1942 Miami Hurricanes football team represented the University of Miami as an independent during the 1942 college football season. The Hurricanes played their eight home games at Burdine Stadium in Miami, Florida. The team was led by sixth-year head coach Jack Harding and finished with a 7–2 record.

Schedule

References

Miami
Miami Hurricanes football seasons
Miami Hurricanes football